Lancero (English: Lancer) is a military course and a denomination within the Colombian National Army. The course takes place at the School of Lanceros of Colombia in Tolemaida, Department of Tolima in Colombia.
The Colombian Army has been in a military conflict with rebel guerrillas since the 1960s.  This has led the Colombian Government and its military forces to develop courses specifically aimed to the training of both soldiers and officers for this kind of warfare.  The term Lancero was chosen as a way to honor a specific unit of fighters (Lancers) that helped the army of Simón Bolívar in his conflict for the independence of Colombia.  This unit showed special bravery and strength during the Battle of Vargas Swamp.

History of the Course
The course was created as a result of the reform that took place inside the National Army of Colombia organization during the early 60s as a way to specialize and refocus the national army towards an irregular conflict with armed peasants in the mountains of Colombia. Inexperienced and with little knowledge of guerrilla warfare the Colombian Army sent its own officers to Fort Benning in Georgia, United States so they could take the Ranger Course that takes place there and as a way to apply their acquired knowledge in Colombia's specific situation.

The techniques learned in the American course were modified and taught to officers and NCOs of the Army and some enlisted and ranking officers of the Naval Infantry. This techniques were later spread across the Military Forces.

In 1959, Captain Hernando Bernal Duran raised the first Lancer Companies of the National Army, modeled after the US Army Rangers and the Korean War Ranger Companies (applying lessons learned in the Colombian peacekeeping deployments of the Korean War). These newly created companies were more agile and flexible thus, leading to more successful operations. They were added as supportive personnel for units where the enemy was even more aggressive and active.

In 1966 an outbreak of dispersed bandits called for the creation of even sharper and faster units. This year the Colombian Army's military command put into effect a more extensive training program to combat the rebels; this program would later become a single course called "Contraguerrillas"

Since this time the Lancero course has focused on the training of Soldiers, Army Officers and even Police Officers for the needs of a country with an enemy that hides among the civilian population. After more than forty years the course has gained some notoriety among military personnel around the globe largely due to its focusing on guerrilla warfare and not on regular military warfare.

The Lancero and Lanza concept
The term Lancero which can be translated as lancer has  subsequently led to the use of the term Lanza (Lance) as a way to refer to a fellow soldier. In fact the course has emphasized on the importance of cooperative work between two soldiers as a way to accomplish goals (one being the Lanza or spear and the other one being the lancero or lance carrier). Thus, the terms Lanza and Lancero are both colloquial and honoring ways to call a fellow soldier or an officer.

See also

Ranger
Lance
Fire and maneuver

References

National Army of Colombia
Military of Colombia
Ministry of National Defense (Colombia)
Military education and training